The Maricel Drama Special is a Philippine anthology drama series and broadcast which was aired on ABS-CBN from March 27, 1989, to May 12, 1997. Replacing Maricel Regal Drama Special and was replaced by Kaya ni Mister, Kaya ni Misis.

See also
List of programs broadcast by ABS-CBN
Kaya ni Mister, Kaya ni Misis

References

Philippine anthology television series
1989 Philippine television series debuts
1997 Philippine television series endings
ABS-CBN original programming
1980s Philippine television series
1990s Philippine television series
Filipino-language television shows